The 2022 Kansas Secretary of State election was held on November 8, 2022, to elect the Secretary of State of Kansas.  Incumbent Republican Scott Schwab won re-election to a second term.

Republican primary

Candidates

Declared
Mike Brown, former Johnson County Commissioner
Scott Schwab, incumbent secretary of state

Endorsements

Results

Democratic primary

Candidates

Declared
Jeanna Repass, church outreach director

Results

Libertarian convention

Candidates

Nominee
Cullene Lang, veteran and perennial candidate

General election

Predictions

Results

References

External links
Official campaign websites
Jeanna Repass (D) for Secretary of State
Scott Schwab (R) for Secretary of State

Secretary of State
Kansas
Kansas Secretary of State elections